Cedric Brown (born May 6, 1954), is a former American professional football player who  played in 9 NFL seasons from 1976-1984 for the Tampa Bay Buccaneers.

References

1954 births
Living people
Players of American football from Columbus, Ohio
American football safeties
Tampa Bay Buccaneers players
Kent State Golden Flashes football players